Orillia/Matchedash Lake Water Aerodrome  is located  north of Orillia, Ontario, Canada.

See also
 Orillia Airport
 Orillia/Lake St John Water Aerodrome

References

Registered aerodromes in Ontario
Transport in Orillia
Seaplane bases in Ontario